Anarsia patulella is a moth of the family Gelechiidae. It was described by Francis Walker in 1864. It is found in Australia, India, Thailand, Sri Lanka, Taiwan Laos and Australia.

The wingspan is 10–11 mm.

The larvae feed on Prunus salicina and Nephelium species.

References

patulella
Moths described in 1864
Moths of Asia
Moths of Australia